"One Night Is Not Enough" is the sixth single released by Scotland-based indie rock band Snow Patrol, the second to come from their second album, When It's All Over We Still Have to Clear Up. It was released on 5 March 2001 under the Jeepster record label, and was the last release under them as they were dropped soon after. The song peaked at number 92 on the UK Singles Chart.

Reception
NME's Alex Needham reviewed the single negatively saying the song "feels like a lifetime - and one nobody sane would be in a hurry to return to, either." He said that it "hits you like a shot of pure camphor, taking you back to those dark, pre-CD:UK days when The Chart Show used to run down the indie chart." He went on to criticize Snow Patrol, calling them "too poor and unimaginative to have made videos."

Track listings
Maxi CD
 "One Night Is Not Enough" – 3:26
 "Monkey Mobe" – 1:18
 "Workwear Shop" – 2:25

Promo CD
 "One Night Is Not Enough" – 3:22

Charts

References

2000 songs
2001 singles
Jeepster Records singles
Snow Patrol songs
Songs written by Gary Lightbody
Songs written by Jonny Quinn
Songs written by Mark McClelland